The Ontario rubric is a rubric system used to mark students in the Ontario provincial school system.

The Ontario rubric is typically a chart with five columns.  The first defines the category that is being evaluated, and the other four show levels 1 through 4. Level 1 is 50%–59%, Level 2 is 60%–69%, Level 3 is 70%–79%, and Level 4 is 80%–100%.  Some teachers represent a perfect mark by suffixing a plus sign to the 4+ ("Level 4++").  Moreover, some teachers will use R+, R, and R-, used to represent 40%-49%, 30%-39%, and 0%-29%, respectively.

The below table shows the percentages equivalent to the achievement levels in Ontario's secondary schools.  

This next table shows the letter grades assigned to achievement levels in Ontario's elementary schools.

The rows are typically broken into four strands:

Knowledge/Understanding
Thinking/Inquiry
Application
Communication

In the elementary schools they are also sometimes organized into sections for projects,  for example:

Appearance/Neatness
Organization
Information and Understanding
General Appeal

Rubrics are used for marking. Their purpose is for a more objective marking process when marking subjective items. i.e. an essay, piece of artwork, tech project, or any project with multiple components i.e. computer program. They also aim to avoid student/teacher confusion.  Rubrics provide a breakdown of these four strands. These strands are not weighted evenly. For example, If a student receives a low mark in only one of the rows, their overall grade could be drastically reduced if that strand is weighted heavier than the others.  Similarly, if one receives a low mark in a strand that is not weighed heavily, it can have little effect on their mark.

The Ontario Rubric appears to be evolving into something known as a "competency profile".  Competency profiles are seen as being more user-friendly for teachers and students than the traditional text-based list of criteria.

References

Education in Ontario